Leave It to Stevie is a reality television series featuring American DJ/producer Stevie J. The show premiered on December 19, 2016 on VH1 and is the third spin-off of Love & Hip Hop: Atlanta.

Development
On July 7, 2016, Stevie's estranged partner Joseline Hernandez revealed that their spin-off Stevie J & Joseline: Go Hollywood had been picked up for a second season, however it would not return due to their separation. Instead, Stevie announced he would star in a solo series, The Stevie J Show.

On December 1, 2016, VH1 announced the show, now titled Leave It To Stevie, would make its series premiere on December 19, 2016, back-to-back with the third season of K. Michelle: My Life.

Series synopsis

Overview and casting
Leave It to Stevie chronicles the life of Grammy Award-winning songwriter Stevie J as he navigates life as a bachelor in Atlanta, Georgia.

Several members of Stevie J's family and inner circle, as well as other cast members from the Love & Hip Hop franchise, appear as supporting cast members or "featured guests" in green screen confessional interview segments throughout the series. They include Grammy Award-winning singer Faith Evans, Stevie's children Savannah Jordan, Sade Jordan, Stevie Jordan Jr. and Eva Jordan and his  Love & Hip Hop: Atlanta co-stars Yung Joc, Lil Scrappy and Tommie Lee. Love & Hip Hop: Hollywoods Ray J, Stevie's assistant and lesbian urban model Renaye Diaz, singer Dalvin DeGrate of Jodeci, Mimi Faust and R&B singer Alexis Branch would appear in minor supporting roles in the first season, while comedian Michael Blackson, bodybuilder Lee Haney and singer Kelly Price would make guest appearances.

The show returned for a second season with Stevie's oldest son Dorian joining the cast, along with Love & Hip Hop: Hollywoods  Safaree Samuels. Faith Evans, Tommie Lee and Mimi Faust would return in guest appearances. The season would also feature guest appearances from Laz Alonso, Love & Hip Hop: Hollywoods Nikki Mudarris, K. Michelle and Love & Hip Hop: Miamis Amara La Negra.

Cast timeline

Episodes

Series overview

Season 1 (2016–17)

Season 2 (2018)

References

External links
 

Love & Hip Hop
2010s American reality television series
2016 American television series debuts
English-language television shows
VH1 original programming
Television shows set in Atlanta
2018 American television series endings
American television spin-offs
Reality television spin-offs